the place seen in first picture is not Athyial it's Athshal.(Nabeel Mughal)
Boi is one of the 51 union councils of Abbottabad District in the Khyber Pakhtunkhwa province of Pakistan. Boi is a Hindko word meaning "fragrance of roses", referring to rose flowerbeds found in the area.

Location 

The Union Council of Boi is located in the north west part of Abbottabad District and forms part of the district's eastern border with Kashmir (Muzaffarabad District). It is located at 34°18'10N 73°26'20E and has an average elevation of 853 metres (2801 feet).

History

According to Captain Wace's Report of the Land Revenue Settlement of the Hazara district 1868-1874, the Boi tract was a cluster of 25 small hill villages, situated for the most part in the hills above the Kunhar river and was originally a part of the territory of the Bamba Chief of Muzaffarabad, Sultan Hussain Khan. Ousted from his Muzaffarabad territory in 1847 he thereafter resided at the village of Boi. He died in 1860, leaving his heir, Sultan Barkat Khan as Chief. Sultan Barkat khan was then succeeded by his son Sultan Hassan Ali Khan Sani, a great leader and witty ruler. Sultan was known for his justice and his people used to call him "Baba Sahib" (means; respectable). Sultan of Boe had two sons, Sultan Mohemmed Qayyum Khan and Kashif Khan (Ex Secretary Food KPK). Sultan Hassan Ali khan had a learned friend, an intellectual fellow and beloved son-in-law named Hussain Khan of Lawasi. Hussain Khan proved to be the most upright and disciplined person of the family. Hussain Khan of Lawasi has two sons Tanveer Hussain Khan of Palhotar and Naveed Hussain Khan (Ex Director Information Azad Kashmir). Coming to the rights of the tract, they were settled on the basis of the arrangement then found to be in force.The Boi villages are owned by small communities of cultivating proprietors of Abbasi (Sararra Abbasi living in Battangi and Tori,  Dhund Abbasi), maliks, Awans, Karrals, Quraishis, Sardars, Sadats, Dhunds and other classes, excepting a few estates and lands which the chief has all along kept in his own possession and management.

Subdivisions

Boi Union Council is divided into the following areas:

 Bandi Samanand
 Dhanni
 MustafaAbad
 Barbeen
 Batangi
 Boi
 Didal
 Nakka
 Pal
 RanKot
 Tori

Education 
 Govt Degree College Boi, Abbottabad 
With the efforts of District member Zaheer Abbasi from Dalola, Ali Asghar Khan, MPA Dr. Azhar Khan Jadoon, Mushtaq Ghani and all the participants from Kukmang, Boi and Dalola achieved this milestones. KP Govt announced the opening ceremony of Govt Degree College Boi Abbottabad on January 29, 2018. Classes for BS program will be start in Govt higher Secondary School Boi building temporarily in May 2018. Later Govt Degree college Boi building will be completed in seeri Boi which is proposed location and classes shifted to the new building. 
 Govt Higher Secondary School Boi

 Govt Maktab school Battangi Boi
 Govt Middle School Tori Sharif Boi
 Govt primary school Tori sharif Boi
 Govt English Medium Model school Dhani Boi
 Govt Girls Middle School Seri Boi
 Govt Girls Primary School Barbeen Boi
 Govt Girls Primary School Dhani Boi
 Govt high school Sarhan boi
 Govt primary school Chiriali
 Govt primary school Sambli Dana Boi
 Sir Syed Model Public School Barbien Boi Abbottabad
 Iqra model Public School Barbien Boi Abbottabad.
 Govt primary school DEEDAL
 Govt primary school MUJAFFA
 Govt primary school NAKKA
 Govt primary school GALI MEERAN
 Govt primary school MURI MERA
 Govt primary school Pal
 Govt primary school Bandi samand
 Govt primary school Barbein
 Govt primary school Sathal
 Govt primary school Makreela
 Govt primary school Rankot
 Govt primary school Kot Sambli
 Govt primary school Mantahar Sambli
 Govt primary school Dheri Seri
 Govt primary school Sarhan
 Govt primary school Bogran
 Govt Girls primary School Bogran
 Govt primary school Chak
 Govt primary school Bandi Hamza
 Govt primary boys school Hadora Bandi
 Govt primary school Dawatta
° Govt primary girls schools Hadora bandi
◌ Govt primary school boys chora Hadora Bandi

Social Organization
Civil Hospital Boi, Abbottabad*

Civil Hospital Boi is a public sector, non-profit tertiary level hospital located in Boi, Abbottabad, of the Khyber-Pakhtunkhwa province of Pakistan. Civil Hospital Boi is the only Hospital in circle Bakot including 12 union councils.currently 3 doctors are working in this hospital. Ultrasound and x rays facilities are currently available at hospital. There is around 20 members of staff working at ATH. Only 3 doctors are employed at the hospital, including senior doctor, trainee and house officer. Other staff members includes paramedics, nurses, and allied health professionals. Civil Hospital Boi is a 32-bed tertiary care public hospital.

‹›  Civil hospital Serhan also reseently conctruted with the help of foreign funded.

National Bank of Pakistan, Boi Branch*

The National Bank of Pakistan (NBP) is a major Pakistani commercial bank with headquarters in Karachi. Although state-owned it operates as commercial bank, while still continuing to act as trustee of public funds and as the agent to the State Bank of Pakistan in places where SBP does not have a presence.

The bank provides both commercial and public sector banking services. National Bank of Pakistan has developed a wide range of consumer products, to enhance business and cater to the different segments of society and meet its social responsibilities. Some schemes have been specifically designed for the low to middle income segments of the population. It has implemented special credit schemes like small finance for agriculture, business and industries, administrator to Qarz-e-Hasna loans to students, self-employment scheme for unemployed persons, public transport scheme. The Bank has expanded its range of products and services to include Shariah Compliant Islamic Banking products
The Only Bank in Union Council Boi, situated at Main Boi Bazar. Currently online transactions of money and other banking facilities are available at the Branch.

Tameer Foundation*

Tameer foundation was established in 2011, with its core mandate working for betterment of Health, Education, Youth Development. This foundation was established by International humanitarian and social activist Naseer Ahmed Adam (Naser-Islamabad).  In 2013 Tameer Foundation also started its social work in field of Tourism, Women development and Wildlife. Tameer foundation organized many workshops, Knowledge walks and Women home made items exhibition in Abbottabad.
Youth Organization Boi, Abbottabad*

Youth Organization Boi Abbottabad was established in 2013. It is non profit & nongovernmental organization working for social development and education. Particular areas of interest are health, education, political education, human rights, youth awareness and rural development. It consists of an independent educational community included as a self organized NGO which meets the interests and objectives of the community.

Tourism and Tourist Places

Boi is located on the banks of the river Kunhar in a cool, lush green valley known for its natural springs and waterfalls. Due to its relatively cool temperatures during the summer, the area attracts tourism from both the surrounding region and from various other locations, especially in northern Pakistan. Moreover, the surrounding area which includes several picturesque hills and valley is also a tourist spot. Beside the river Kunhar, there are many flowery meadows that further attract tourists such as hikers and picnicgoers.

References

Union councils of Abbottabad District

fr:Boi (district d'Abbottabad)